The , JTA, is an organization which was set up on October 1, 2008 as an agency of the Ministry of Land, Infrastructure, Transport and Tourism.

Background of establishment 

Japan Tourism Agency seated itself with intentions to stimulate local economies and to further international mutual understanding, following legislation of Basic Act on Promotion of Tourism Nation (in December 2006, to wholly revise Tourism Basic Act), committee resolutions in both Houses of the Diet in the legislation process, and decision at a Cabinet meeting of Basic Plan (in June 2007) which was drawn as provided by the Basic Act. One legal basis of the Agency is Act for Establishment of the Ministry of Land, Infrastructure, Transport and Tourism.

The two committee resolutions (of almost the same contents) are made by the Committee on Land and Transport of each House of the Diet, to point out eight issues on which the government should take appropriate measures when it enforces the Basic Act. In the issue No. 8 it was stated that the government should make efforts to set up tourism agency or so.

In the Basic Plan, five fundamental targets are set, whose substances are, respectively, to increase the number of:
a. foreign tourists visiting Japan;
b. international meetings held in Japan;
c. nights for stay in accommodations per one Japanese during domestic sightseeing tours;
d. Japanese tourists to overseas;
e. expenditure in Japan on sightseeing tours.
All the five targets each have numerical value. Many among the total of 25 various targets each have some numerical value.

Departments
 General Affairs Division
 Tourism Industry Division
 International Tourism Policy Division
 International Exchange Promotion Division
 Tourism Area Promotion Department

See also
 Japan National Tourism Organization
Itaru Ishii

Notes

External links
 Japan Tourism Agency

Tourism Agency
Agency
2008 establishments in Japan
Tourism agencies
Government agencies established in 2008